Raging Violence is the debut album by American thrash metal band Hirax, released in 1985 through Metal Blade Records.

Track listing

Personnel
Katon W. De Pena (Bobby Johnson) - vocals
Gary Monardo - bass
Scott Owen - guitars
John Tabares - drums

Production
Bill Metoyer - engineering
Tom G. Warrior - logo
Stephanie Barrett - photography
Joe Henderson - photography
Bill Hale - photography
John Fetters - photography
Rick Smith - photography
Ken Rojas - photography
Todd Nakamine - photography
Morgan Young - photography
Lisha Mahoney - photography
Brian "Pushead" Schroeder - cover art

References 

1985 debut albums
Hirax albums
Metal Blade Records albums
Speed metal albums
Albums with cover art by Pushead